Allonemobius shalontaki, also known as the Choctaw ground cricket, is a species of ground cricket in the subfamily Nemobiinae. It is found in North America. The common name refers to the fact that the cricket was first discovered within the Choctaw Nation, and the species epithet means cricket in the Choctaw language.

References

Trigonidiidae
Orthoptera of North America
Insects described in 2006